Yoshiko Yano (矢野美子 Yano Yoshiko, born August 1, 1985) is a Japanese volleyball player who plays for Toyota Auto Body Queenseis.

Clubs
 Miyazaki Prefectural MiyakonojoShogyo High School
 Denso Airybees (2004-2012)
 Toyota Auto Body Queenseis (2012–present)

Awards

Team
2008 2007-08 V.Premier League -  Runner-up, with Denso.
2008 57th Kurowashiki All Japan Volleyball Tournament -  Champion, with Denso.
2010 Empress's Cup -  Champion, with Denso.
2014 63rd Kurowashiki All Japan Volleyball Tournament  Champion, with Toyota Auto body.

References

External links
 Japan Volleyball League - official profile 
 Toyota Auto Body Queenseis - official profile 

Japanese women's volleyball players
Living people
1985 births